is a railway station on the Tsukuba Express line in Adachi, Tokyo, Japan, operated by the third-sector railway operating company Metropolitan Intercity Railway Company.

Line
Aoi Station is served by the 58.3 km Tsukuba Express line from Akihabara Station in Tokyo to Tsukuba Station in Ibaraki Prefecture. It is numbered "TX06".

Station layout
The station has two underground side platforms serving two tracks.

Platforms

History
The station opened on 24 August 2005.

External links

 TX Aoi Station 

Railway stations in Tokyo
Stations of Tsukuba Express
Railway stations in Japan opened in 2005